Samuel A. Azzinaro (born January 29, 1943) is an American politician and a Democratic member of the Rhode Island House of Representatives representing District 37 since January 2009. A veteran who served in the United States National Guard and Army Reserves, Azzinaro is currently the Chairman of the House Committee on Veterans' Affairs.

Education
Azzinaro attended the Rhode Island School of Design, studying textile courses.

Elections
2012 Azzinaro was unopposed for both the September 11, 2012 Democratic Primary, winning with 358 votes and the November 6, 2012 General election, winning with 5,311 votes.
2008 When District 37 Democratic Representative Peter Lewiss retired and left the seat open, Azzinaro was unopposed for the September 9, 2008 Democratic Primary, winning with 164 votes and won the November 4, 2008 General election with 3,794 votes (53.4%) against Republican nominee George Markham, who had run for the seat in 2006.
2010 Azzinaro was unopposed for the September 23, 2010 Democratic Primary, winning with 250 votes and won the three-way November 2, 2010 General election with 3,062 votes (60.2%) against Republican nominee Philip Gingerella and Independent candidate Robert Gionet.

References

External links
Sam Azzinaro's Official Campaign Website
Official page at the Rhode Island General Assembly
Samuel Azzinaro at Ballotpedia
Samuel A. Azzinaro at OpenSecrets

Place of birth missing (living people)
1943 births
Living people
Democratic Party members of the Rhode Island House of Representatives
People from Westerly, Rhode Island
Rhode Island School of Design alumni
21st-century American politicians